Larrymania is an American reality television series that premiered on October 7, 2012 on Universo. The series follows Mexican-American singer Larry Hernandez as he navigates through his musical career and juggles family life.

On May 9, 2019, Telemundo announced that the series has been renewed for an eighth season. The season premiered on September 15, 2019.

Series overview

Episodes

Season 1 (2012)

Season 2 (2013)

Season 3 (2014)

Season 4 (2015)

Season 5 (2016–17)

Season 6 (2017–18)

Season 7 (2018–19)

Season 8 (2019)

References 

Lists of American non-fiction television series episodes
Lists of reality television series episodes